Adrien Niyonshuti (born 2 January 1987) is a Rwandan former professional bicycle racer, who rode professionally for  from 2009 to 2017. In 2021, he worked as a directeur sportif for UCI Continental team . In 2023, he will be leading the Benin National Cycling team to prepare for the UCI Championships to be held on the continent in 2025.

Although he survived, six of Niyonshuti's brothers were killed in the Rwandan genocide of 1994. Nilyonshuti began riding a bicycle given to him by his uncle as a teenager, when he came to the attention of former professional cyclist Jacques Boyer in 2006 during the first Wooden Bike Classic.

Career
Born in Rwamagana, Eastern Province, Rwanda, Niyonshuti began amateur cycling at the age of sixteen. In 2006, he came to the attention of a former professional cyclist, Jacques Boyer. The first American cyclist to compete in the Tour de France, Boyer was working in Rwanda on a project to import cargo bicycles for coffee farmers. Boyer also assumed the role of coach for the Rwandan national cycling team, and recruited Niyonshuti to race. Niyonshuti had good initial results in local races such as the Tour of Rwanda, in which he finished in the top ten five years in a row and won in 2006 and 2008.

In 2008, Niyonshuti attended the Africa Continental Centre Training Camp in South Africa, where he was offered a contract by Douglas Ryder, the directeur sportif of UCI Continental Team . He started his first UCI European road race in August 2009 with his participation in the Tour of Ireland, becoming the first Rwandan cyclist to ride in the European professional peloton. Niyonshuti qualified to represent Rwanda in the cross-country mountain bike race during the 2012 Summer Olympic Games in London. He was also Rwanda's flagbearer at the opening ceremony.

Niyonshuti competed for Rwanda again at the 2016 Summer Olympics in Rio de Janeiro. He did not finish the men's road race. He was the flagbearer for Rwanda again during the opening ceremony. In 2017, he was aiming to make his Grand Tour debut.

Post-retirement and coaching activities

After the 2012 London Olympic Games Niyonshuti immediately felt he wanted to offer the chance for aspiring cyclists in his country to experience the power of cycling, to instill hope and to pass on its positive values to future generations. The Adrien Niyonshuti Cycling Academy idea was born and the first location chosen was his home town of Rwamagana. Along with support from Team Africa Rising and the Rising from Ashes Foundation the academy was officially launched in the August 2013. The Academy ran successfully until December 31, 2022 producing two professional gravel cyclists signed by Team Amani and Eric Muhoza, who was signed for the 2023 season by Team BikeAid. Eric Muhoza is Adrien's cousin. Adrien closed his Academy at the end of 2022, to focus on his work developing African cyclists in Europe and as a consultant for the National Cycling Team of Benin. Adrien worked as the Directeur Sportif for Team Benin A at the 2022 Tour du Benin.

On 14 July 2022, Adrien was invited by the Qhubeka Charity to take part in a high profile promotional event at the Tour de France. Qhubeka is the charity of the Tour, and had planned an ascent of the iconic Alpe d'Huez on one of their single-speed Qhubeka bicycles. Adrien knows the Qhubeka Charity well, having been part of a large distribution of their bicycles in 2012, and also having attended several distributions of Qhubeka bicycles to schoolchildren during his time on the MTN-Qhubeka/Dimension Data professional team. 

Adrien completed the ascent of the Alpe d'Huez in an impressive 1 hour 36 minutes, and members of the international media were waiting for him at the finish line. After interviews with leading TV, radio and print media journalists, several articles have appeared, including Cycling Tips and Outdoor Online.

Major results

2004
 6th Overall Tour of Rwanda
2005
 7th Overall Tour of Rwanda
2007
 4th Overall Tour of Rwanda
2008
 1st  Overall Tour of Rwanda
2009
 3rd Overall Tour of Rwanda
 10th Road race, African Road Championships
2010
 1st  Road race, National Road Championships
 African Road Championships
4th Time trial
8th Road race
 8th Overall Tour of Rwanda
2011
 1st  Road race, National Road Championships
 1st Overall Tour de Kigali
 5th Overall Kwita Izina Cycling Tour
 6th Overall Tour of Rwanda
 9th Road race, All-Africa Games
 9th Time trial, African Road Championships
2012
 1st  Road race, National Road Championships
 African Road Championships
7th Team time trial
9th Time trial
10th Road race
 9th Overall Tour of Rwanda
2013
 9th Overall Tour of Rwanda
2014
 3rd Time trial, National Road Championships
2015
 10th Time trial, African Road Championships
2016
 National Road Championships
1st  Time trial
2nd Road race
2017
 1st  Time trial, National Road Championships
2018
 2nd  Team time trial, African Road Championships

References

External links
 Land of Second Chances: The Impossible Rise of Rwanda's Cycling Team
 Ryder Cycling Profile: Adrien Niyonshuti
 The Adrien Niyonshuti Cycling Academy 
 Rising from Ashes (2012) IMDb page
 
 
 
 

1987 births
Living people
Rwandan male cyclists
Cyclists at the 2012 Summer Olympics
Cyclists at the 2016 Summer Olympics
Olympic cyclists of Rwanda
Cyclists at the 2014 Commonwealth Games
Commonwealth Games competitors for Rwanda
People from Eastern Province, Rwanda
Competitors at the 2011 All-Africa Games
African Games competitors for Rwanda